Ian Blount Garrett (born April 3, 1996) is an American soccer player.

Club career
Born in Kalamazoo, Michigan, Garrett started playing soccer at the age of four, and joined the IMG Academy programme before playing for the under-18 side of Chicago Fire between 2014 and 2015.

After leaving the St. Louis Ambush, where he played indoor soccer, in 2017, Garrett moved abroad to Finland, where he pursued a journeyman career. He played at a number of Finnish teams, also playing a season in Sweden, before joining Veikkausliiga club KTP ahead of the 2021 season.

Career statistics

Club

Notes

References

1996 births
Living people
Sportspeople from Kalamazoo, Michigan
Soccer players from Michigan
IMG Academy alumni
American soccer players
Association football defenders
Major Arena Soccer League players
Kakkonen players
Ettan Fotboll players
Ykkönen players
Veikkausliiga players
MLS Next Pro players
Chicago Fire FC players
St. Louis Ambush (2013–) players
Vasa IFK players
FF Jaro players
Jakobstads BK players
Nyköpings BIS players
Vaasan Palloseura players
Kotkan Työväen Palloilijat players
Rochester New York FC players
American expatriate soccer players
American expatriate sportspeople in Finland
Expatriate footballers in Finland
American expatriate sportspeople in Sweden
Expatriate footballers in Sweden